The Lower Swat Valley in Swat and Lower Dir Districts in Pakistan is an area of important archeological sites.

The lower valley of the Swat River has been occupied for the last 3000 years. The area between Chakdara Bridge and Saidu Sharif is littered with the remains of pre historic Aryan's Gandhara grave culture, Buddhist shrines and buildings of the Shahi Period. These archaeological sites are concentrated around three towns: Barikot, Odigram and Saidu Sharif.

Barikot
Near the Chakdara Bridge there are ruins from the Hindu Shahi Period and stupas at Haibatgram, Top Dara and Landakai.

About 25 kilometres from Chakdara Bridge (About 20 kilometres before Saidu Sharif ),  Birkot  is the site of ancient town Bazira  sacked by Alexander in 326 BC. This town is situated on ancient route on the River Swat from Nawa Pass. Here ancient route  take a turn to south through Karakar Pass into Buner which  further lead to Shabaz Garhi in Peshawar Valley.

Gumbat Stupa is situated 9 kilometres south of Birkot (locally known as Barikot) in the Kandag Valley. This is one of the best preserved stupas of Swat. It consists of a cell of about 12 feet square with windows. It is surrounded on all sides by a narrow passage intended to walk around sacred images while worshipping. Before Gumbat is a large building known as Kanjar Kot, meaning  Dancer’s Mansion. The place is beautiful but it is not advisable to walk there without the help of locals. From the end of the road to the stupa you need to walk about 30 minutes (at least).  Besides the remains of the stupa, there are some remains of the monastery. Nothing has been done so far to preserve the site, but the stupa itself is in a rather good condition.

Mount Elum, 2811 meter High Mountain is considered sacred since ancient times. In the valley of Amluk-Dara near the foot of Mount Elum is the ruin of a Amluk-Dara stupa.

Three kilometers from Barikot towards Saidu Sharif is Shingardar Stupa (on your right hand side). You can easily access up to the stupa by car. The site is close to the road and safe. 1.5 kilometers from Shingardar is a large Buddha Carving on a cliff facing the road.. Further after 6 kilometers is the Gogdara Rock Carvings. These 3000-year-old engraving consist of different animals. There are some carvings that show people driving two-wheeled war chariots. These carvings were probably works of ancient Aryans. On the same rock there are some Buddhist carvings.

The gateway of Swat Barikot. 
Barikot is a town in the Khyber-Pakhtunkhwa province of Pakistan, located in the Swat valley region (ancient Udyana). Barikot is the present day name of the ancient "Bazira", which was besieged by Alexander the Great. Ancient fortifications by the name of Barikot-Ghwandai, located on the outskirts of the town, are being excavated by an Italian Archaeological mission since 1984. The oldest layer built of bricks and stone probably corresponds to the fortress besieged by Alexander. However, no traces of the Macedonian occupation have been found yet. The sequent layers consist of fortifications built by the Indo-Greek kings. A stone wall in Hellenistic style was built around the city, with equidistant quadrangular bastions, all according to Attic measurements. Ruins of palatial quarters as well as areas related to the Buddhist have been unearthed During the Kushan period, Barikot experienced rapid development with the creation of building dedicated to workmanship. Barikot has become a very important archaeological site, rivaling Taxila, for the study of history in northern Pakistan. A large quantity of the artefacts are preserved in the National Museum of Oriental Art of Rome, and the MAO in Turin. The nearby sanctuary of Butkara I has been very valuable in the study of the development of Greco-Buddhist art.

Odigram
Odigram is located 8 kilometers from Saidu Sharif. Aurel Stein identified this with Ora, a city where Alexander fought one of his battles. Italian archaeologists excavated this site in the 1950s. This site was occupied from 1000 BC to the 14th century AD.

During the Hindu Shahi period from the 8th century to the 10th century this was the regional capital of Swat. Ruins of  Raja Gira's Fort, the last Hindu ruler, were excavated by the Italians in the 1950s. The first mosque; Mahmud Ghaznavi Mosque built in Swat was excavated in 1985 below the Hindu Shahi Fort in 1985.

Sites around Mingora
Mingora is one of the most important towns of the Swat Valley. It is situated 2 km from Saidu Sharif. On the other side of River Swat near Mingora Airport a site of Gandhara Grave Culture was discovered by Italian-led excavations at Aligrama. The site was dated to 1000 BC.
Sites are known as "Butkara I" (easily accessible, small fee) and Butkara II (an excavation lost in the hills and harder to find, free access).  Both sites are safe.

Near Mingora in Jambill River Valley many Buddhist remains and carvings have been found. At Panr, a stupa and monastery from the 1st century AD have been excavated. At Loebanr and Matalai, Italians archaeologist unearthed 475 Aryan graves dated 1700 BC.

References
 Book: Hidden Treasures of Swat, 2014.

External links 
How Swat Valley went from basket case to on the mend

Archaeological sites in Khyber Pakhtunkhwa
Buddhist sites in Pakistan
History of Pakistan
Swat District
Lower Dir District
Gandhara